Philotheca myoporoides subsp. petraea is a subspecies of flowering plant in the family Rutaceae and is endemic to a small area in Victoria, Australia. It is an erect shrub with leathery, egg-shaped leaves with the narrower end towards the base, and white flowers arranged singly or in groups of up to four in leaf axils.

Description
The stamens are free from each other and hairy. Flowering has been observed in November.

Taxonomy and naming
This subspecies was first formally described in 2001 by Andrew Carl Frank Rozefelds in the journal Muelleria from specimens collected on Mount Stewart in East Gippsland in 1995.

Distribution and habitat

References

myoporoides
Flora of Victoria (Australia)
Sapindales of Australia